Beavercreek is an unincorporated hamlet and census-designated place in Clackamas County, Oregon, United States, located  southeast of Oregon City. The population was 4,485 at the 2010 census.

Demographics

History
According to Oregon Geographic Names, the name "Beaver Creek" was first used for a school district in this area in the early 1850s. It was named for the creek that flows through the community and into the Willamette River. A post office operated under various names in the locality until 1922, when the name was changed to Beavercreek, the form still used today. Beavercreek's ZIP code is 97004.

In the summer of 2006, the citizens of Beavercreek voted to become Oregon's first hamlet, a system of quasi-government which exists in Clackamas County, Oregon. A final hearing by the board of county commissioners on the formation of the hamlet took place in September 2006, and officially recognized the community as The Hamlet of Beavercreek. The hamlet holds monthly community meetings at the Beavercreek Grange hall, except for quarterly town hall meetings, which may be held at other locations to accommodate attendance.

Education
The community is served by the Oregon City School District, Canby School District, Colton School District, and Molalla River School District. Beavercreek Elementary School is located in the Hamlet.

Points of interest

Miller House
Just after 1900, the Miller family built a farm house on the corner of what is now Ridge Road and Lower Highland Road. The home was moved to keep it from being destroyed and is being restored by current Beavercreek residents Rick and Kassandra Young. The Miller House was the childhood home of Ava Helen Miller, who married Linus Pauling, the only person to be awarded two unshared Nobel Prizes (for chemistry in 1954 and for peace in 1962).

Geocaching
Beavercreek is the birthplace of geocaching. The first documented placement of a GPS-located cache took place on May 3, 2000, by Dave Ulmer of Beavercreek a few miles west of the community.

Notable residents
 Jeff Gillooly
 Tonya Harding, figure skater
 Ava Helen Pauling (Miller), human rights activist, wife of Linus Pauling

References

External links
 Beavercreek Hamlet map
 Hamlet of Beavercreek (official website, hosted on meetup.com)
 The Hamlet of Beavercreek official page at Clackamas County website

Hamlets in Oregon
Portland metropolitan area
Unincorporated communities in Clackamas County, Oregon
Census-designated places in Oregon
Census-designated places in Clackamas County, Oregon
Unincorporated communities in Oregon